General elections were held in Tuvalu on 25 July 2002. All candidates were independents, as there are no political parties in the country. Saufatu Sopoanga was appointed Prime Minister after the election as the previous Prime Minister Koloa Talake lost his seat.

Campaign
A total of 39 candidates contested the 15 seats. There were 5,188 registered voters.

Results
Six members of the former parliament lost their seats including Prime Minister Koloa Talake and the Speaker, Tomu Sione.

Aftermath
On 2 August 2002 Saufatu Sopoanga, who had been Minister of Finance in the previous government, was elected Prime Minister.

Subsequent by-elections

The following by-elections were held during the 2002-2006 Parliament:
2003 Nanumea by-election
2003 Niutao by-election
2003 Nukufetau by-election
2004 Nukufetau by-election
2005 Nui by-election
2005 Nanumea by-election
 2005 Nanumaga by-election

References

Elections in Tuvalu
2002 elections in Oceania
Non-partisan elections
Election